The Buffalo River is a  tributary of the Red River of the North in western Minnesota in the United States. Via the Red River, Lake Winnipeg and the Nelson River, it is part of the watershed of Hudson Bay.

Course
The Buffalo River flows from Tamarac Lake in the Tamarac National Wildlife Refuge in central Becker County and flows generally westwardly into Clay County, past the towns of Hawley and Georgetown and through Buffalo River State Park.

The river's largest tributary is the  South Branch Buffalo River, which rises in western Otter Tail County and flows initially westward into northern Wilkin County, then northward into Clay County.  It joins the main stem of the river near Glyndon, Minnesota.

See also
List of Minnesota rivers
List of longest streams of Minnesota

References

 Waters, Thomas F. (1977).  The Streams and Rivers of Minnesota.  Minneapolis: University of Minnesota Press.  .

Rivers of Becker County, Minnesota
Rivers of Clay County, Minnesota
Rivers of Otter Tail County, Minnesota
Rivers of Wilkin County, Minnesota
Rivers of Minnesota
Tributaries of the Red River of the North